Donalio Melachio Douanla (born 24 September 1997) is a Cameroonian professional footballer who plays as a defender for Djiboutian club Arta/Solar7.

Career
Douanla began in Petrocub Hîncești's senior squad in the 2016–17 season, making three appearances as the Moldovan National Division club placed sixth; with his first match coming against eventual champions Sheriff Tiraspol on 3 May 2017. He subsequently featured a further thirteen times in the following campaign of 2017. His first Petrocub goal arrived on 31 October 2018 during a win over Milsami Orhei in the Moldovan Cup, a competition he and the club would go on to win in 2020.

Career statistics
.

Honours
Petrocub Hîncești
Moldovan Cup: 2019–20

References

External links

1997 births
Living people
Place of birth missing (living people)
Cameroonian footballers
Association football defenders
Cameroonian expatriate footballers
Expatriate footballers in Moldova
Cameroonian expatriate sportspeople in Moldova
Moldovan Super Liga players
CS Petrocub Hîncești players